Bimala B.K. is a Nepali politician and a member of the House of Representatives, elected under the proportional representation system from CPN UML, filling the reservation seat for Dalits as well as women. She is State Minister of Minister of Industry, Commerce and Supplies  .

References

Living people
Dalit politicians
Nepal MPs 2017–2022
Communist Party of Nepal (Unified Marxist–Leninist) politicians
People from Bardiya District
1986 births